Monteleone d'Orvieto is a comune (municipality) in the Province of Terni in the Italian region Umbria, located about 35 km southwest of Perugia and about 60 km northwest of Terni.

History
According to 16th-century historian Cipriano Manente, Monteleone was founded by the comune of Orvieto in 1052, as a castle guarding its northern boundaries. In 1373 Emperor Charles IV assigned it to the viscounts of Turrena, and later it was contended by several local barons such as the Corbara family and a nephew of Pope Sixtus IV. In 1481 it was returned to Orvieto.

In 1643, during the War of Castro fought between the Barberini Pope Urban VIII and the house of Farnese, Monteleone was besieged and destroyed by the troops of Florence.

Main sights
Remains of the medieval walls, including the northern gate.
Church of SS. Apostoli Pietro e Paolo. It houses a Madonna with Child between Sts. Paul and Peter, once attributed to Perugino but most likely from his collaborator Giacomo di Ser Guglielmo of Città della Pieve.
Church of SS. Crocifisso (17th century)
Medieval Torrione ("Big Tower"), offering a wide panorama of Umbria, Tuscany and Lazio.
Castel Brandetto (11th century, destroyed in 1350). Now it is a private-owned residence showing few remains of the medieval edifice.

References

Cities and towns in Umbria